Apteroloma is a genus of primitive carrion beetles in the family Agyrtidae. There are about 14 described species in Apteroloma.

Species
These 14 species belong to the genus Apteroloma:

 Apteroloma anglorossicum Semenov, 1890
 Apteroloma arizonicum (Van Dyke, 1928)
 Apteroloma caraboides (Fall, 1907)
 Apteroloma discicolle
 Apteroloma gotoi
 Apteroloma harmandi Portevin, 1903
 Apteroloma jinfo Ruzicka, Schneider & Hava, 2004
 Apteroloma kozlovi Semenov-Tian-Shanskij & Znojko, 1932
 Apteroloma potanini Semenov, 1893
 Apteroloma sillemi Jeannel, 1935
 Apteroloma tahoecum (Fall, 1927)
 Apteroloma tenuicorne (Leconte, 1859)
 Apteroloma tenuicornis (LeConte, 1859)
 Apteroloma zhejiangense Tang, Li & Růžička, 2011

References

Further reading

 

Staphylinoidea
Articles created by Qbugbot